Slyudyanka is the name of several inhabited localities in Russia:

Urban localities
Slyudyanka, a town in Slyudyansky District of Irkutsk Oblast; 

Rural localities
Slyudyanka, Altai Krai, a selo in Mikhaylovsky Selsoviet of Ust-Kalmansky District in Altai Krai; 
Slyudyanka, Mamsko-Chuysky District, Irkutsk Oblast, a settlement in Mamsko-Chuysky District of Irkutsk Oblast;